Prince Mihailo Obrenović III of Serbia (16 September 1823 – 10 June 1868) was the ruling Prince of Serbia from 1839 to 1842 and again from 1860 to 1868. His first reign ended when he was deposed in 1842, and his second ended when he was assassinated in 1868. He is considered to be a great reformer and the most enlightened ruler of modern Serbia, as one of the European enlightened absolute monarchs. He advocated the idea of a Balkan federation against the Ottoman Empire.

Early life
Mihailo was the son of Prince Miloš Obrenović (1780–1860) and his wife Ljubica Vukomanović (1788–1843, Vienna). He was born in Kragujevac, the second surviving son of the couple. In 1823, he became the first person in Serbia to be vaccinated against smallpox, which took away the lives of three of his siblings: Petar, Marija and Velika. He spent his childhood in Kragujevac, then in Požarevac and Belgrade. Having finished his education in Požarevac, Mihailo left Serbia with his mother to go to Vienna. His elder brother by four years, Milan Obrenović II, born in 1819, was frequently in poor health.

First reign
Initially, Prince Miloš abdicated in favour of his firstborn Milan Obrenović II, who was by then terminally ill and died after just one month of rule. Mihailo came to the throne as a minor, having been born in late 1823, and proclaimed prince on 25 June 1839. He was declared of full age the following year. Few thrones appeared more secure, and his rule might have endured throughout his life but for his want of energy and inattention to political developments. In his first reign, his inexperience meant he did not cope well with the challenges Serbia faced.
In 1842, his reign was ended by a rebellion led by Toma Vučić-Perišić, which enabled the Karađorđević dynasty to assume power.

Life in exile
After the overthrow, Prince Mihailo withdrew from Serbia across the Sava and Danube with around one thousand of his adherents. His destiny was decided by Austria and Turkey. Prince Mihailo was directed to the estate of his sister Savka Nikolić, while Princess Ljubica was sent to Novi Sad. She died there in 1843. Mihailo organized her burial at Krušedol monastery.

He wrote to Vučić in 1853 to say that he did not want to recover the throne by violence. The prince later moved to Vienna with his father, Prince Miloš Obrenović. There he managed his father's large estate. At that time, he wrote the poem "Što se bore misli moje. He married Countess Júlia Hunyady de Kéthely (26 August 1831 – 19 February 1919), the daughter of Count Ferenc Hunyady de Kéthely and Countess Júlia Zichy de Zich and Vásonkeő. The marriage was childless, although he had at least one illegitimate child by a mistress whose identity is unknown. While in exile, he learned to speak French and German fluently.

Second reign and assassination

Mihailo was accepted back as Prince of Serbia after 18 years in exile, in September 1860, after the death of his father who had regained the throne in 1858. For the next eight years, he ruled as an enlightened absolute monarch. During his second reign, the People's Assembly was convened just three times, in 1861, 1864 and 1867. Prince Mihailo's greatest achievement was in persuading the Turkish garrisons to leave Serbia, in 1862 (when the Ottoman Army left the fortresses of Užice and Soko Grad) and 1867 (when the Turks left their fortifications in Belgrade, Šabac, Smederevo and Kladovo). This was achieved with major diplomatic support from Russia and Austria. In 1866–68, Mihailo forged The First Balkan Alliance by signing the series of agreements with other Balkan entities.

During his rule, the first modern Serbian coins were minted. He was also the first in modern Serbian history to declare Belgrade the capital city of the country.

Mihailo wished to divorce his wife, Julia, in order to marry his young mistress, Katarina Konstantinović, the daughter of his first cousin, Princess Anka Obrenović.  Both resided at the royal court at his invitation. His plans for a divorce and subsequent remarriage to Katarina met with much protest from politicians, clergy and the general public. His astute and gifted Prime Minister Ilija Garašanin was dismissed from his post in 1867 for daring to voice his opposition to the divorce. However, the divorce never took place.

While Prince Mihailo Obrenović was gradually introducing absolutism, a conspiracy was formed against him. The main organizers and perpetrators were the brothers Radovanović, who wanted to avenge their brother, Ljubomir Radovanović, who was in prison. Kosta Radovanović, the main perpetrator, was a wealthy and respected merchant. His brother, Pavle Radovanović, was with him during the assassination, and the third of the brothers, Đorđe Radovanović, was also involved.

On 10 June 1868 Mihailo was travelling with Katarina and Princess Anka in a carriage through the park of Košutnjak near his country residence on the outskirts of Belgrade.
In the park appeared Pavle and Kosta Radovanović in formal black suits, and pointing a loaded gun at the Prince, Kosta approached the carriage.  Prince Mihailo Obrenović recognized him, because of a dispute over his brother Ljubomir. The last words of the prince, which Kosta himself admitted when on trial, were: "Well, it's true." Mihailo and Anka were shot dead, and Katarina wounded. Further details of the plot behind the assassination have never been clarified; the sympathizers and cousins of the Karađorđević dynasty were suspected of being behind the crime, but this has not been proven.

Anka's granddaughter Natalija Konstantinović was married in 1902 to the Montenegrin Prince Mirko Petrović-Njegoš (1879–1918), whose sister Zorka had married King Petar Karađorđević I in 1883.

Prince Mihailo was awarded Order of Prince Danilo I, Order of the White Eagle (Russian Empire), Order of Saint Anna, Order of Saint Alexander Nevsky, Order of the Redeemer, Order of Saints Maurice and Lazarus, Order of the Medjidie, Order of Glory (Ottoman Empire) and Order of Leopold (Austria).

Gallery

See also
 Čukur Fountain
 Treaty of Vöslau

References

External links

 
 

1823 births
1868 murders in Europe
1868 deaths
19th-century murdered monarchs
19th-century Serbian monarchs
Assassinated Serbian people
Burials at St. Michael's Cathedral (Belgrade)
Deaths by firearm in Serbia
Eastern Orthodox Christians from Serbia
Eastern Orthodox monarchs
Mihailo
People from Kragujevac
People murdered in Serbia